J-function may refer to:
 The Klein j-invariant or j function in mathematics
 Leverett J-function in petroleum engineering